Se rentan cuartos is a Mexican sitcom television series created by David Hernández and produced by Viacom International Studios and Endemol Shine Boomdog for Comedy Central Latin America. It premiered on 30 October 2019, and is stats Itatí Cantoral, Armando Hernández, Paco Rueda, Yare Santana, Irving Peña, Carlos Espejel, María Chacón, and Jorge Ortín. On 29 October 2019, before its premiere it was confirmed that the series had been renewed for a second season to be released on 29 January 2020.

Plot 
Se rentan cuartos follow the story of a wealthy family that ends in bankruptcy and they have no choice but to start a new life in a house located in one of the most popular neighborhoods of the Mexico City. There they will learn valuable life lessons about the people they once despised.

Cast

Main 
 Itatí Cantoral as Graciela Garza De La Garza y Más Garza
 Paco Rueda as Bobby Garza De La Garza y Más Garza
 Yare Santana as Estefanía "Stef" Garza De La Garza y Más Garza
 Jorge Ortín as El Chofer
 Armando Hernández as José Ignacio "Pepenacho" Garza De La Garza y Más Garza
 María Chacón as Shantallé
 Carlos Espejel as Chicopasote
 Irving Peña as Tato
 Roberto Palazuelos (season 2)

Guest stars 
 Alejandra Bogue (season 1)
 Luis Felipe Tovar (season 2)
 Kikín Fonseca (season 2)
 Ernesto Laguardia (season 2)
 Ramiro Fumazoni (season 2)
 Anabel Ferreira (season 2)
 Tony y Archie Balardi (season 2)
 Gustavo Munguía (season 2)
 Marcos Valdez (season 2)

Episodes

Season 1 (2019)

Season 2 (2020)

Season 3 (2021)

Season 4 (2022)

References 

Mexican television sitcoms
Comedy Central original programming
Spanish-language television shows
2019 Mexican television series debuts